Papcastle is a civil parish in the Borough of Allerdale in Cumbria, England.  It contains 22 listed buildings that are recorded in the National Heritage List for England.  All the listed buildings are designated at Grade II, the lowest of the three grades, which is applied to "buildings of national importance and special interest".  The parish contains the village of Papcastle and the surrounding countryside.  Almost all the listed buildings are houses and associated structures in the village.  The other listed buildings are a farmhouse and a milestone at Dovenby Craggs.


Buildings

References

Citations

Sources

Lists of listed buildings in Cumbria